The Embriaco were a prominent Genoese family, who played an important role in the history of the Crusader states. It also gave consuls, admirals and ambassadors to the Republic of Genoa.

The family ruled the city of Byblos (in present-day Lebanon), styling themselves "Lord (Signore) of Gib(e)let" or "Gibelletto", the name which the city was called at the time. Their rule lasted for almost 200 years, from 1100 to the late 13th century.

History
They arrived in the Kingdom of Jerusalem as early as 1099, with Guglielmo Embriaco and his brother Primo di Castello. They had Byblos, given to Ugo I Embriaco by Bertrand of Toulouse, from about 1110, thanks to Embriaco's military assistance in the creation of the Crusader states, on behalf of the Republic of Genoa.

Guglielmo Embriaco's son, Ugo I, was the first administrator of "Gibelletto" in the name of the Genoese republic, he then obtained the city as a hereditary fief, undertaking to pay an annual fee to Genoa and to the church of San Lorenzo.

The family always protected the Genoese traders in the Levant, exempting them from all duties. Their power in Byblos lasted, apart from occupation by Saladin 1187–1197, to the end to the thirteenth century, when they were defeated by Bohemond VII of Tripoli, and finally pushed out by Muslim advances.

The Embriacos were Lords of lands in Liguria and in Lunigiana. And had properties and a square in Genoa. The male line of the family died out in the half of the 15th century.

Embriaco family tree 

Guglielmo I Embriaco of Gibelletto, Lord of Gibelletto (b. 1040) (r. 1109 – after 1118)
Ugo I Embriaco of Gibelletto (de), Lord of Gibelletto (c. 1110 – ?) (r. before 1127 – 1135), married Adelasia
Guglielmo II Embriaco of Gibelletto (de), Lord of Gibelletto (r. 1135−1157), married Sancha from Provence
Ugo II Embriaco of Gibelletto (de), Lord of Gibelletto (r. 1157−1184) (d. 1184)
Ugo III Embriaco, Lord of Gibelletto (de) (r. 1184−1187) (d. 1196), married Stephanie of Milly, and had:
Guido I Embriaco, Lord of Gibelletto (1197–1241) (d. 1241), married Alice, daughter of Bohemond III of Antioch, in 1204 and had:
Maria (born before October 1214)
Enrico I Embriaco of Gibelletto, Lord of Gibelletto (r. 1241−1271) (d. c. 1271), married c. 1250 Isabelle d'Ibelin, and had:
Baliano Embriaco of Gibelletto (d. 26 August 1313, Nicosia)
Guido II Embriaco of Gibelletto, Lord of Gibelletto (r. 1271−1282) (d. 1282 in Nephin) married Margaret Grenier of Sidon, daughter of Julian Grenier, Lord of Sidon
Maria Embriaco of Gibelletto (es) (d. Nicosia 1331/4, buried there), married c. 1295 Philip of Ibelin, Seneschal of Cyprus and Jerusalem (1253–1318)
Juan de Ibelin (1302 – after 1317)
Guy of Ibelin, married Margaret of Ibelin, with whom he had:
John of Ibelin (d. after 1367)
Alice of Ibelin (d. after 1374), married John of Lusignan, with whom she had: James of Lusignan (died 1395/1397), Peter of Lusignan (died February 10, 1451, who had an illegitimate son Phoebus of Lusignan), Eleanor of Lusignan (died c. 1414), married c. 1406 her cousin Henry of Lusignan and Loysia of Lusignan married her cousin Eudes/Odo of Lusignan
Margaret of Ibelin
Balinese of Ibelin (died 1349), married a woman also named Margaret of Ibelin
Isabel de Ibelin (1300 – after 1342), married Ferdinand of Majorca
Helvis de Ibelin (1307 – after 1347), married Henry II, Duke of Brunswick-Grubenhagen, with whom she had: Philip (c. 1332 – 4 August 1369/70), Riddag (c. 1334 – 1364/67), Balthazar (c. 1336 – aft. 14 January 1384), Thomas (c. 1338 – c. 1384), Melchior (c. 1341 – 6 June 1381) and Helvis, married Louis de Nores
Catherine Embriaco of Gibelletto, married Jean of Antioch
Peter Embriaco of Giblet (r. 1282−1289) (d. after 1310), the last Lord of Gibelletto married Douce de Gaurelée, then Agnes Embriaco of Gibelletto
Silvestre Embriaco of Gibelletto
Giovanni Embriaco of Gibelletto (d. January 1282 in Nephin), married daughter of Hugh l'Aleman
Baldovino Embriaco of Gibelletto (d. January 1282 in Nephin)
Maria Embriaco of Gibelletto (d. c. 1290), married Balian II Grenier, titular Lord of Sidon
Raimondo Embriaco of Gibelletto (es) (died after 1238)
Bertrando Embriaco of Gibelletto (died after 1271)
Agnes Embriaco of Gibelletto, married Barthelemy of Saint Simeon, Lord of Soudin
Ugo Embriaco of Gibelletto
Plaisance Embriaco of Gibelletto (d. c. 1217), married Bohemond IV of Antioch
Pavia, married Garnier l'Aleman
Raimondo Embriaco of Gibelletto (es) (before 1135 – after 1204), married a noblewoman from Principality of Antioch, Constable of Tripoli
Guglielmo Embriaco of Gibelletto, married Eva
John de Embriaco (de) (before 1228 – around 1262), Marshal of Jerusalem, married Femia de Cesarea, daughter of Walter III of Caesarea, lord of Cesarea, with whom he had Isabel, who married Guillermo Filangieri; then he married Juana de Lanelée, with whom he had Balian, Juan and Femia (Eufemia), who married Guido de Soissons.
Bertrando I Embriaco of Gibelletto (d. after 1217), married Doleta, daughter of Stephen of Armenia
Ugo Embriaco of Gibelletto (d. after 1264), married Marie Porcelet
Bertrando II Embriaco of Gibelletto (es) (murdered 1258)
Barthelemy Embriaco of Gibelletto (killed on 26 April 1289 during the Fall of Tripoli), married Helvis, daughter of Pierre de Scandelion
Bertrando III Embriaco of Gibelletto
Ugo Embriaco of Gibelletto, married Catherine de la Roche 
Agnes Embriaco of Gibelletto, married Gauvain de la Roche, then Peter Embriaco of Giblet
Guglielmo Embriaco of Gibelletto (murdered in January 1282 in Nephin)
Lucie Embriaco of Gibelletto, married Juan de Botron (es)
Marguerite Embriaco of Gibelletto, married Baudouin Ibelin
Guglielmo III Embriaco of Gibelletto (de), (d. after December 1204), married Fadie, daughter of Manasses of Hierges
Agnes Embriaco of Gibelletto, married Guermond II (de), with whom she had a daughter, Helvis who later married Roland de Lucca

Offspring of Guglielmo III

Guglielmo III Embriaco of Gibelletto
 Ugo di Gibelletto (de) (d. c. 1220), Lord of Besmedin, married Agnes de Ham and had:
 Raimondo di Gibelletto (de) (d. c. 1253), Lord of Besmedin, married firstly Marguerite de Scandelion and secondly Alix de Soudin, and had:
 Giovanni I di Gibelletto, married Poitevine, daughter of a Marshal of Tripoli
 Giovanni II di Gibelletto (d. c. 1315), married Marguerite du Plessis, without issue.
 Maria di Gibelletto
 Ugo di Gibelletto, died young
 Enrico di Gibelletto (de) (d. 1310), Lord of Besmedin, married Marguerite de Morf, without issue
 Bertrando di Gibelletto, died young
 Eschiva di Gibelletto, married Raymundo Visconti
 Agnese di Gibelletto
 Susanna di Gibelletto, died young
 Maria di Gibelletto, married Guy de Montolif
 Gerardo de Ham di Gibelletto (d. 1225)
 Guglielmo II di Gibelletto (d. c. 1243), married Anne de Montignac, and had:
 Eudes di Gibelletto, died young
 Girard di Gibelletto, died young
 Giovanni III di Gibelletto, Lord of Saint-Foucy, married Gillette d'Angiller, and had:
 Guglielmo III di Gibelletto, married in 1318 Marie de Verny, without issue
 Maria di Gibelletto
 Eschiva di Gibelletto (d. c. 1350), married Simon Petit (d. 1355/1338)
 Stefania di Gibelletto, married Amaury le Bernier
 Maria di Gibelletto, married Amaury le Flamenc
 Eufemia di Gibelletto, died young
 Agnese di Gibelletto, died young
 Adamo di Gibelletto (de), Lord of Adelon
 Agnese di Gibelletto, married Thierry de Termonde

See also
 War of Saint Sabas
 Byblos Castle
Embriachi workshop, apparently run by later relatives

References

External links
 Tripoli at fmg.ac.

Republic of Genoa families
History of Byblos

de:Herrschaft Gibelet